Neil Cochran (born 12 April 1965) is a male Scottish former competitive swimmer who represented Great Britain in the Olympics, European championships and World University Games, and swam for Scotland in the Commonwealth Games, during the 1980s.  Cochran competed in medley and freestyle swimming events.

Swimming career
As a 17-year-old at the 1982 Commonwealth Games in Brisbane, Australia, he won a bronze medal as a member of the third-place Scottish team in the men's 4x200-metre freestyle relay, alongside Douglas Campbell, Graeme Wilson and Paul Easter, finishing behind the Australian and English teams.

At the 1984 Summer Olympics in Los Angeles, California, he won two bronze medals.  He was a member of the third-place British team in the men's 4×200-metre freestyle relay, alongside Paul Easter, Paul Howe and Andrew Astbury, finishing behind the Americans and West Germans.  In individual competition, he won a second bronze in the  200-metre individual medley, coming third after Canadian Alex Baumann and American Pablo Morales.  He also advanced to the B Final of the 200-metre backstroke, finishing fourteenth overall.

Swimming for Scotland at the 1986 Commonwealth Games in Edinburgh, he won a bronze in the 200-metre individual medley. He won a gold medal in the 200-metre individual medley at the 1987 Summer Universiade, and a silver as a member of the British men's team in the 4x100-metre medley relay at the 1987 European Championships.

When Seoul, South Korea hosted the 1988 Summer Olympics, Cochran qualified in three individual events.  He was eliminated in the preliminary heats of the men's 100-metre backstroke, but advanced to the B Finals of the 100-metre butterfly and 200-metre individual medley, finishing sixteenth and eleventh, respectively.

At the ASA National British Championships he won the 100 metres backstroke title in 1988,  the 100 metres butterfly title in 1987 and the 200 metres butterfly title in 1987.

See also
 List of Commonwealth Games medallists in swimming (men)
 List of Olympic medalists in swimming (men)

References

External links
 British Olympic Association athlete profile

1965 births
Living people
European Aquatics Championships medalists in swimming
Scottish male freestyle swimmers
Male medley swimmers
Olympic bronze medallists for Great Britain
Olympic bronze medalists in swimming
Olympic swimmers of Great Britain
Scottish male swimmers
Swimmers at the 1984 Summer Olympics
Swimmers at the 1988 Summer Olympics
Scottish Olympic medallists
Commonwealth Games bronze medallists for Scotland
Swimmers at the 1982 Commonwealth Games
Swimmers at the 1986 Commonwealth Games
Medalists at the 1984 Summer Olympics
Commonwealth Games medallists in swimming
Universiade medalists in swimming
Universiade gold medalists for Great Britain
Medalists at the 1987 Summer Universiade
Medallists at the 1982 Commonwealth Games
Medallists at the 1986 Commonwealth Games